Miconia suborbicularis is a species of plant in the family Melastomataceae. It is endemic to Ecuador.

References

Endemic flora of Ecuador
suborbicularis
Vulnerable plants
Taxonomy articles created by Polbot
Taxa named by Alfred Cogniaux